Events from the year 1905 in Michigan.

Office holders

State office holders
 Governor of Michigan: Fred M. Warner (Republican)
 Lieutenant Governor of Michigan: Alexander Maitland (Republican) 
 Michigan Attorney General: John E. Bird
 Michigan Secretary of State: George A. Prescott (Republican)
 Speaker of the Michigan House of Representatives: Sheridan F. Master (Republican)
 Chief Justice, Michigan Supreme Court:

Mayors of major cities

 Mayor of Detroit: George P. Codd (Republican)
 Mayor of Grand Rapids: Edwin F. Sweet (Democrat)
 Mayor of Saginaw: Henry E. Lee

Federal office holders

 U.S. Senator from Michigan: Julius C. Burrows (Republican)
 U.S. Senator from Michigan: Russell A. Alger (Republican) 
 House District 1: Alfred Lucking (Democrat)/Edwin Denby (Republican)
 House District 2: Charles E. Townsend (Republican)
 House District 3: Washington Gardner (Republican)
 House District 4: Edward L. Hamilton (Republican)
 House District 5: William Alden Smith (Republican)
 House District 6: Samuel William Smith (Republican)
 House District 7: Henry McMorran (Republican)
 House District 8: Joseph W. Fordney (Republican)
 House District 9: Roswell P. Bishop (Republican)
 House District 10: George A. Loud (Republican)
 House District 11: Archibald B. Darragh (Republican)
 House District 12: H. Olin Young (Republican)

Population

Sports

Baseball
 1905 Detroit Tigers season – The Tigers compiled a 79-74 record and finished in third place in the American League. The team's statistical leaders included Sam Crawford with 75 RBIs and a .297 batting average and Ed Killian with a 23-14 record and a 2.27 earned run average.
 1905 Michigan Wolverines baseball season - Under head coach Lew "Sport" McAllister, the Wolverines compiled a 16–3 record and won the Western Conference championship. Charles Campbell was the team captain.

American football
 1905 Michigan Wolverines football team – Under head coach was Fielding H. Yost, the Wolverines compiled a 12–1, outscored its opponents by a combined total of 495 to 2, and lost the final game of the season by a score of 2–0 against the University of Chicago.
 1905 Michigan Agricultural Aggies football team – 
 1905 Michigan State Normal Normalites football team -

Chronology of events

Births
 February 6 - Merze Tate, the first African-American graduate of Western Michigan Teachers College, first African-American woman to attend the University of Oxford, and first African-American woman to earn a Ph.D. in government and international relations from Harvard University, in Blanchard, Michigan
 May 16 - Ken Doherty, decathlon champion, college track and field coach, author and longtime director of the Penn Relays, in Detroit
 June 24 - Fred Alderman, sprint runner who won a gold medal in 4 × 400 m relay at the 1928 Summer Olympics, in East Lansing, Michigan
 July 11 - Neil Staebler, Michigan Democratic Party leader, in Ann Arbor, Michigan
 September 10 - William Clemens, film director (On Dress Parade, The Case of the Velvet Claws The Case of the Stuttering Bishop), in Saginaw, Michigan
 November 18 - William S. Carlson, President of the University of Delaware, University of Vermont, State University of New York, and University of Toledo, in Ironwood, Michigan
 December 1 - Charles Van Riper, internationally known pioneer in the development of speech pathology and treatment of stuttering, in Champion Township, Michigan

Deaths
 March 18 - Cyrus G. Luce, Governor of Michigan (1887-1891), at age 80 in Coldwater, Michigan
 June 30 - George Washington Peck, Michigan Secretary of State (1848-1850) and Congressman from Michigan 4th District (1855-1857), at age 87 in Saginaw, Michigan

See also
 History of Michigan
 History of Detroit

References